Lottia filosa is a species of sea snail, a true limpet, a marine gastropod mollusk in the family Lottiidae, one of the families of true limpets.

Description

The shell can grow to be 20 mm in length.

Distribution
It can be found off of Mexico to Colombia and off of the Galapagos Islands.

References

Lottiidae
Gastropods described in 1865